Selfism refers to any philosophy, theory,  doctrine, or tendency that upholds explicitly selfish principles as being desirable. The term is usually used pejoratively.

Definition
The term "selfism" was used by Paul Vitz in his 1977 book Psychology as Religion: The Cult of Self-Worship. Vitz deconstructs the selfist movement(s) and tries to uphold God-centered altruism, and claims that all of modern-day liberalism and leftism are essentially selfist at their core. He lays the blame predominantly at the feet of Erik Erikson, Erich Fromm, and other prominent psychologists of the third quarter of the 20th century (c. 1950–1975 CE).

Explicit selfishness as a desirable end and moral good had diverse manifestations during that period, for example, in the writings of David Seabury, Ayn Rand, and even among some of Rand's near-opposites, such as Erikson and Fromm. Rand called her philosophy Objectivism. Later popularizers of similar positions include Nathaniel Branden, Paul Lepanto, Robert Ringer, Harry Browne, and David Kelley, among others. None of these named the system they espoused "selfism" or characterized it as "selfist", although both Seabury and Rand included the word "selfishness" in the titles of books presenting their views. Many of these figures were pro-capitalist secularists ("atheist capitalists"), but Seabury was a Christian, while Erickson and Fromm were prominent leftists.

Anton LaVey, founder of the Church of Satan and author of The Satanic Bible, acknowledges Ayn Rand and Objectivism as a source of inspiration for LaVeyan Satanism. This form of Satanism holds the self above all else in similar fashion to Objectivism. Despite some similarities, they remain separate entities, as there are clear differences between the two concepts.

Origins of selfist thought
Some early examples of "selfist" thinking are the egoistic philosophies of Yangism in ancient China and of Cyrenaic hedonism in ancient Greece.  Yangists followed the teachings of Yang Zhu and might have been influenced by Taoism.  Cyrenaics, founded by Aristippus of Cyrene, were skeptics and materialists (but perhaps nominally Greek pagans). Thomas Hobbes, who could also be viewed as selfist, was a materialist but also advocated loyalty to a strong government and state church. The views of Friedrich Nietzsche and Max Stirner provide a more proximate link to the modern selfists.

See also

References

 The Virtue of Selfishness. Ayn Rand, .
 David Seabury. The Art of Selfishness (1990, 1971).
 Paul Vitz. Psychology as Religion: The Cult of Self-worship (2nd ed., Eerdmans, 1994, original ed., 1977) (W.B. Eerdmans Publishing Co., Grand Rapids, MI)

Egoism
Philosophy of life
Self
Social theories